For the broadcasting of sports events at the Big East men's basketball tournament, here is the list of the various media broadcasters including sports commentators.

Television 

 NOTE: In 2020, Fox Sports 1 broadcast the two first-round games and the first half of the first game of the quarterfinals. At halftime of the first game of the quarterfinals, the remainder of the tournament was cancelled due to the COVID-19 pandemic. The broadcasters listed are the ones who covered the two first-round games and the first half of the first quarterfinal game on Fox Sports 1.

Radio

Local radio

Virtual Reality

References

Broadcasters
Big East Finals
ESPN College Basketball
Fox Sports announcers
CBS Sports
Basketball on NBC